The Seventh-day Adventist Church is a major Christian denomination with a small presence in Thailand. The Seventh-day Adventist Church in Thailand (มูลนิธิคริสตจักรวันเสาร์แห่งประเทศไทย) began in 1919. The Thailand Adventist Mission had a reported 14,997 members as of 30 June 2020.

Social work
The Seventh-day Adventist Church operates a school of higher education in Thailand called Asia-Pacific International University. The church operates two hospitals in Thailand called Bangkok Adventist Hospital (locally called Mission Hospital) and Mission Hospital Phuket.

History
R. A. Caldwell, came to Thailand in 1906 to hand out Seventh-day Adventist literature. 10 years later Seventh-day Adventist colporteurs came to Thailand and found believers meeting in Bangkok. Chinese businessman, Tan Thian Tsua, moved to Bangkok and started the first Seventh-day Adventist Church in the country. The early work grew among Chinese in Bangkok. The Thailand Adventist Mission was founded in 1919 by missionaries, E. L. Longway and Forrest A. Pratt.

See also
Australian Union Conference of Seventh-day Adventists
Seventh-day Adventist Church in Brazil 
Seventh-day Adventist Church in Canada 
Seventh-day Adventist Church in the People's Republic of China
Seventh-day Adventist Church in Colombia 
Seventh-day Adventist Church in Cuba
Seventh-day Adventist Church in India 
Italian Union of Seventh-day Adventist Churches
Seventh-day Adventist Church in Ghana
New Zealand Pacific Union Conference of Seventh-day Adventists 
Seventh-day Adventist Church in Nigeria
Adventism in Norway
Romanian Union Conference of Seventh-day Adventists 
Seventh-day Adventist Church in Sweden 
Seventh-day Adventist Church in Tonga
Seventh-day Adventists in Turks and Caicos Islands

References

External links
 http://www.adventist.or.th

Protestantism in Thailand
History of the Seventh-day Adventist Church
Thailand
Seventh-day Adventist Church in Asia